Falköping Airport is an airport located in Falköping for business and club aircraft. The airport was inaugurated in 1985 and was built by the government of Falköping Municipality to accommodate Kinnarps's desire to have a nearby airfield for its business flights. The airport is only a few hundred meters from Sikagården's industrial area on the outskirts of Falköping. At the airport, Falbygden's Aviation Club operates. The Aviation Club arranges training for glider certificates, motor flight certificates (EASA-PPL) and certificates for ultralight aircraft.

References

External links

Airports in Sweden
Buildings and structures in Västra Götaland County
1985 establishments in Sweden
Airports established in 1985